When the Mills are Running (Swedish: Där möllorna gå) is a 1956 Swedish film directed by Bengt Järrel and starring Edvard Persson, Ingeborg Nyberg and Börje Mellvig. It was shot at the Sundbyberg Studios in Stockholm and on location in the Netherlands. The film's sets were designed by the art director Arne Åkermark.

Cast
 Edvard Persson as Blomster-Pelle Pettersson  
 Ingeborg Nyberg as Bella  
 Börje Mellvig as Kurt Brennerth  
 Mimi Nelson as Mrs. Ina Brennerth  
 Harry Ahlin as Fredrik Storm  
 Stina Ståhle as Hilda Storm  
 Kristina Adolphson as Greta
 Kenneth Bergström as Olle Bergzell  
 Karl Erik Flens as Kalle Träff  
 Fred Gerle as Hasse Johansson  
 Nils Kihlberg as Björn Johansson  
 Kolbjörn Knudsen as Frithiof Bergzell  
 Gerard Lindqvist as Georg Svensson 
 Curt Löwgren as Policeman Pettersson  
 Maritta Marke as Vivan Borglund  
 Toivo Pawlo as Fritz Jönsson  
 Mim Persson as Mrs. Frideborg Bergzell  
 Gösta Prüzelius as Sidenius  
 Olav Riégo as Speaker  
 Hendrik Roessingh as Tjerk Hendrik van Schouten  
 Gunnel Wadner as Mrs. Eva Sidenius

References

Bibliography 
 Qvist, Per Olov & von Bagh, Peter. Guide to the Cinema of Sweden and Finland. Greenwood Publishing Group, 2000.

External links 
 

1956 films
Swedish drama films
1950s Swedish-language films
1956 drama films
Films shot in the Netherlands
1950s Swedish films